The Alexander River is on the West Coast of the South Island of New Zealand. It flows into the Upper Grey River.

Grey District
Rivers of the West Coast, New Zealand
Rivers of New Zealand